Bernard Ayotte is an American politician from Maine. Ayotte represented District 3 in the Maine House of Representatives, which was part of Aroostook County. Ayotte is a resident of the town of Caswell. He is a Republican and was first elected in 2006. He was re-elected in 2008, 2010 and 2012. He was unable to run for re-election 2014 due to term-limits.

Ayotte graduated from St. Francis University in Biddeford, Maine (now the University of New England) with a degree in biology. He is a veteran of the United States Army and was a teacher and principal in New Sweden, Maine.

In 2009, Ayotte was named to the National Environmental Leadership Group at the National Conference of State Legislatures.

References

Year of birth missing (living people)
Living people
People from Aroostook County, Maine
Republican Party members of the Maine House of Representatives
University of New England (United States) alumni
American school administrators
Schoolteachers from Maine